Patrik Brandner (born 4 January 1994) is a professional Czech football player who currently plays for 1. FC Slovácko.

Career
He joined Dukla from 1. FK Příbram in January 2017, signing a contract until the end of the 2018–19 season.

On 15 February 2019, he joined SK Dynamo České Budějovice.

References

External links
 
 

1994 births
Living people
People from Beroun District
Czech footballers
Association football forwards
Czech First League players
Czech National Football League players
1. FK Příbram players
FK Dukla Prague players
SK Dynamo České Budějovice players
Sportspeople from the Central Bohemian Region
1. FC Slovácko players